

Events

Events at the 1987 Pan American Games
1987
Pan American Games